Calvin Nash (born 8 August 1997) is an Irish rugby union player for Munster in the United Rugby Championship. He plays as a centre or wing and represents Young Munster in the All-Ireland League.

Munster
In January 2017, Nash was added to Munster's squad for the 2016–17 European Rugby Champions Cup. On 3 February 2017, Nash made his competitive debut for Munster when he started against Edinburgh in a 2016–17 Pro12 fixture. He scored his first try for Munster on 26 November 2017, coming off the bench against Zebre in round 9 of the 2017–18 Pro14 and helping the province to a 36–19 away victory. He signed a one-year development contract with Munster in January 2018, which saw him join the senior squad for the 2018–19 season. Nash was nominated for the 2018 John McCarthy Award for Academy Player of the Year in April 2018.

Nash signed a two-year contract extension with Munster in December 2018. Nash made his European debut for Munster in their final pool 4 fixture of the 2019–20 Champions Cup against Welsh side Ospreys on 19 January 2020. He signed a two-year contract extension with the province in February 2021, and signed a further two-year extension in October 2022.

Ireland
Nash was selected in Ireland U20s training squad for the 2017 Six Nations Under 20 Championship. On 24 February 2017, Nash made his debut for the side, captaining the team to a 27–22 home victory against France U20 in Donnybrook Stadium. On 11 March 2017, Nash again captained Ireland U20, scoring a try in his sides 41–27 defeat at the hands of Wales U20 in Eirias Stadium. On 17 March 2017, Nash was again captain in Ireland U20's 14–10 defeat against England U20. He was also selected in the Ireland Under-20s squad for the 2017 World Rugby Under 20 Championship.

Nash was selected in the Emerging Ireland squad that travelled to South Africa to participate in the Toyota Challenge against Currie Cup teams Free State Cheetahs, Griquas and Pumas in September–October 2022. He started and scored one try in Emerging Ireland's 54–7 opening win against Griquas on 30 September, and started again in the 21–14 win against the Cheetahs on 9 October.

Nash earned his first senior international call-up when he was selected by head coach Andy Farrell in the Ireland squad for the 2022 Autumn Nations Series. He started for Ireland A in their 47–19 defeat against an All Blacks XV on 4 November 2022.

References

External links
Munster Profile
URC Profile

U20 Six Nations Profile

Living people
1997 births
People educated at Crescent College
Rugby union players from Limerick (city)
Irish rugby union players
Young Munster players
Munster Rugby players
Ireland Wolfhounds international rugby union players
Rugby union centres
Rugby union wings